The Sri Lanka Railways M4 is a class of diesel-electric locomotive manufactured in Canada by Montreal Locomotive Works. Fourteen of the manufacturers' model MX-620 were imported in 1975.

This was the longest locomotive in the Sri Lanka Railways previously. All units are still operational. On regular operation they are not used beyond Polgahawela on the main line, and are not used on the hill country section. They used to travel on the full main line regularly until the previous decade.

They are painted in a livery of dark blue, light blue, silver with yellow striping; although No. 752 Point Pedro was painted in a special ICE (Intercity Express) livery.

Fleet

Gallery

References

M04
MLW locomotives
Co-Co locomotives
Railway locomotives introduced in 1975
5 ft 6 in gauge locomotives